Evolutionary Blues: West Oakland's Music Legacy, is a 2017 United States documentary film directed by Cheryl Fabio and co-produced by director herself with KTOP and Sarah Webster Fabio Center for Social Justice. The film revolves around the musician West Oakland and the Oakland Blues where described how postwar development impacted African Americans and their musical heritage.

The film received positive reviews and won several awards at international film festivals. The film premiered at the Grand Lake Theatre on 27 September 2017.

Cast
 Alabama Mike
 Betty Marvin
 Dalhart Johnson
 D'Wayne P. Wiggins
 Electra Kimble Price
 The Dynamic Miss Faye Carol
 Freddie W. Hughes
 Fantastic Negrito
 Geoffrey Pete
 Hartfield Brothers
 Chauncey Crosby
 David C Hartfield, Sr.
 Robert Hartfield
 Isabel Wilkerson
 James A. Levi
 James C. Moore, Sr.
 Jesse James
 John Turk
 Lady Bianca
 Larry Payton
 Larry Vann
 Lee Hildebrand
 Leon “Denianke” Williams
 Lenny Williams
 Marvin Holmes
 Nicholas Harper
 Paul Tillman Smith
 Rickey Vincent
 Robert Geddins, Jr.
 Robert O. Self
 Ronald A. Wells
 Ronnie K. Stewart
 Sonny Rhodes
 Sugar Pie DeSanto
 “Terrible Tom” Bowden, Jr.
 Wylie Trass

References

External links
 
 Trailer of Evolutionary Blues on YouTube
 Evolutionary Blues Chronicles the Life and Afterlife of Blues in West Oakland
 Black Artists Featured In Upcoming Danville Exhibition
 New Documentary Focuses on West Oakland’s Blues Legacy

2017 documentary films
American documentary films